Horné Saliby is a village and municipality in Galanta District of  the Trnava Region of south-west Slovakia.

Geography
The municipality lies at an elevation of 117 metres and covers an area of 34.838 km2. It has a population of about 3,156 people.

History
The territory was already a part of the Kingdom of Great Moravia, the first Slavic state ever, when, after weakening battles with the Frankish Empire, in the 9th century, the eastern part of Great Moravia was occupied by nomadic Magyar tribes. The territory of Horné Saliby became part of the Kingdom of Hungary, later acknowledged by the Frankish Empire. In historical records the village was first mentioned in 1233. After the Austro-Hungarian army disintegrated in November 1918, Czechoslovak troops occupied the area, later acknowledged internationally by the Treaty of Trianon. Between 1938 and 1945 Horné Saliby once more  became part of Miklós Horthy's Hungary through the First Vienna Award. From 1945 until the Velvet Divorce, it was part of Czechoslovakia. Since then it has been part of Slovakia.

Genealogical resources

The records for genealogical research are available at the state archive "Statny Archiv in Bratislava, Nitra, Slovakia"

 Roman Catholic church records (births/marriages/deaths): 1678-1931 (parish A)
 Lutheran church records (births/marriages/deaths): 1786-1916 (parish A)
 Reformated church records (births/marriages/deaths): 1792-1896 (parish B)

See also
 List of municipalities and towns in Slovakia

References

External links
https://web.archive.org/web/20070513023228/http://www.statistics.sk/mosmis/eng/run.html
Surnames of living people in Horne Saliby

Villages and municipalities in Galanta District